The European Handball Federation EHF is the governing body for Handball in Europe.
Former Soviet and present Ukrainian side Spartak Kyiv have won a record total of 13 titles in EHF Europe women's club competitions, Three more than the Austrian Hypo Niederösterreich.

The Danish clubs have won the most titles (25), ahead of clubs from the Soviet Union  (21)  and Hungary (20).

Winners

By club

The following table lists all the women's clubs that have won at least one EHF Europe club competition, and is updated as of June 5, 2022 (in chronological order).

Key

By country
The following table lists all the countries whose clubs have won at least one EHF competition, and is updated as of June 5, 2022 (in chronological order).

Key

See also
European Handball Federation

References

External links
EHF Official Webpage

 

+
Handball-related lists